Nashuatec was one of the main brands used by parent company Ricoh to sell office equipment within Europe. It was particularly strong in Germany and the Netherlands where it had the biggest share.

Along with Rex Rotary and Gestetner, it was one of the three brands of the NRG Group. NRG Group has now been merged into Ricoh Europe as of 1 April 2007.

See also
 Photocopying

External links
 Nashuatec

Companies acquired by Ricoh
Companies with year of establishment missing